In Greek mythology, Tlepolemus (Ancient Greek: Τληπόλεμος Tlēpólemos) was the leader of the Rhodian forces in the Trojan War.

Family 
Tlepolemus was a son of Heracles and Astyoche, daughter of Phylas, king of Ephyra. Though some sources say that his mother was Astydameia, daughter of Amyntor or Ormenus.

Mythology 
Tlepolemus fled to Rhodes after slaying Licymnius, Heracles' aged maternal uncle. According to the Bibliotheca, this was an accident—Tlepolemus was beating a servant when Licymnius ran between the two, suffering a fatal blow,—but Pindar states that the death was intentional and motivated by anger. Accompanied by his Argive wife Polyxo, Tlepolemus made passage to Rhodes and divided the island into three parts, founding three Rhodian city-states: Cameirus, Ialysus and Lindus.

Hyginus lists Tlepolemus among the suitors of Helen; thus bound by the oath of Tyndareus, he was among the Greek allies in the campaign against Troy, leading a force of nine ships.

He encountered Sarpedon on the first day of fighting recounted in the Iliad and taunted him saying that he lacked courage and could not really be the son of Zeus. Tlepolemus then attacked him, and although he wounded Sarpedon, he was slain by the latter.

According to Pausanias, Polyxo killed Helen to avenge for her husband's death, though Polyaenus says that Menelaus had dressed up a servant in Helen's clothes and that the Rhodians killed her instead as Menelaus and Helen escaped.

Notes

References 

 Apollodorus, The Library with an English Translation by Sir James George Frazer, F.B.A., F.R.S. in 2 Volumes, Cambridge, MA, Harvard University Press; London, William Heinemann Ltd. 1921. ISBN 0-674-99135-4. Online version at the Perseus Digital Library. Greek text available from the same website.
 Diodorus Siculus, The Library of History translated by Charles Henry Oldfather. Twelve volumes. Loeb Classical Library. Cambridge, Massachusetts: Harvard University Press; London: William Heinemann, Ltd. 1989. Vol. 3. Books 4.59–8. Online version at Bill Thayer's Web Site
 Diodorus Siculus, Bibliotheca Historica. Vol 1-2. Immanel Bekker. Ludwig Dindorf. Friedrich Vogel. in aedibus B. G. Teubneri. Leipzig. 1888-1890. Greek text available at the Perseus Digital Library.
 Gaius Julius Hyginus, Fabulae from The Myths of Hyginus translated and edited by Mary Grant. University of Kansas Publications in Humanistic Studies. Online version at the Topos Text Project.
 Hesiod, Catalogue of Women from Homeric Hymns, Epic Cycle, Homerica translated by Evelyn-White, H G. Loeb Classical Library Volume 57. London: William Heinemann, 1914. Online version at theio.com
 Homer, The Iliad with an English Translation by A.T. Murray, Ph.D. in two volumes. Cambridge, MA., Harvard University Press; London, William Heinemann, Ltd. 1924. . Online version at the Perseus Digital Library.
 Homer, Homeri Opera in five volumes. Oxford, Oxford University Press. 1920. . Greek text available at the Perseus Digital Library.
 Pausanias, Description of Greece with an English Translation by W.H.S. Jones, Litt.D., and H.A. Ormerod, M.A., in 4 Volumes. Cambridge, MA, Harvard University Press; London, William Heinemann Ltd. 1918. . Online version at the Perseus Digital Library
 Pausanias, Graeciae Descriptio. 3 vols. Leipzig, Teubner. 1903.  Greek text available at the Perseus Digital Library.
 Pindar, Odes translated by Diane Arnson Svarlien. 1990. Online version at the Perseus Digital Library.
 Pindar, The Odes of Pindar including the Principal Fragments with an Introduction and an English Translation by Sir John Sandys, Litt.D., FBA. Cambridge, MA., Harvard University Press; London, William Heinemann Ltd. 1937. Greek text available at the Perseus Digital Library.

Kings in Greek mythology
Children of Heracles
Heracleidae
Achaean Leaders
Rhodian mythology